The Latvian Women's Curling Championship is the national championship of women's curling in Latvia. It has been held annually since 2002. It is organized by the Latvian Curling Association.

List of champions

Championships won by curler 
As of 2022

References

See also
Latvian Men's Curling Championship
Latvian Mixed Curling Championship
Latvian Mixed Doubles Curling Championship
Latvian Junior Curling Championships

Curling competitions in Latvia
Women's sports competitions in Latvia
National curling championships
Recurring sporting events established in 2002
2002 establishments in Latvia
Curling